Verteuil-sur-Charente (literally Verteuil on Charente) is a commune in the Charente department in southwestern France.

The village is dominated by the Château de Verteuil.

Population

See also
Communes of the Charente department

References

External links
 

Communes of Charente